Nick Ward is a Welsh singer-songwriter from Porthcawl, South Wales. He signed to UK label AudioFile Records in 2009 and has many releases to his name, Outside Looking In (2009), Pink Bay (2010), Cadenza (2012), World in Reverse (2014) and Phonus Balonus (2017).

Career 
Ward has his roots in new wave but isn't afraid to delve into other genres including country and folk and he cites his main influences as Elvis Costello, Hank Williams, The Beatles, Townes Van Zandt and Ray Davies. Since signing to AudioFile Records he has supported some big-name artists, including The Alarm, Toyah Willcox, Simon Townshend and The Christians. Ward is also being championed by BBC Radio Wales and has appeared in session a number of times on the Alan Thompson Evening Show and 6 Music.

Discography

Singles
 "I Am War" (November 2009)
 "Can You Heal Me Now?" (June 2010)
 "Just look Around You" (August 2010)
 "All The World's A Stage" (July 2011)
 "O Angeline" (September 2011)
 "Now There Is Nothing" – with Atheen (January 2013)
 "Revelation Blues No2" (June 2013)
 "My Good Friend" (January 2014)
 "Well Imagine That" (November 2014)
 "Into The Unknown" (October 2015)
 "I Know You Know We Know" (August 2016)
 "Under A Chemical Sky" (December 2016)
 "Caroline" (January 2018)
 "Come Roll With Me" (June 2018)
 "Shadows And Dust" – with Deborah Wilson (October 2018)
 "Slipstream" (November 2018)
 "Shifting Sands" (August 2019)

EPs
 Rag & Bone EP (May 2009)
 Keep It Under Your Hat (October 2020)

Albums
 Outside Looking In (May 2009)
 Pink Bay (November 2010)
 Cadenza (February 2012)
 World in Reverse (April 2014)
 Phonus Balonus (February 2017)

References

External links
 The Official Nick Ward site
 Nick Ward official facebook page
 Nick Ward official Twitter page
 Nick Ward page at the BBC website

Welsh singer-songwriters
Living people
People from Porthcawl
Year of birth missing (living people)